is a novel by Ivorian author Aké Loba. It won the Grand prix littéraire d'Afrique noire in 1961.

Ivorian novels
1960 novels
Satirical novels
French-language novels
Grand prix littéraire d'Afrique noire winners